Bicyclus iccius, the scarce blue-banded bush brown, is a butterfly in the family Nymphalidae. It is found in Nigeria, Cameroon, the Republic of the Congo, Angola, the Democratic Republic of the Congo and Uganda. The habitat consists of forests.

The larvae feed on Poaceae species.

References

Seitz, A. Die Gross-Schmetterlinge der Erde 13: Die Afrikanischen Tagfalter. Plate XIII 26

Elymniini
Butterflies described in 1865
Butterflies of Africa
Taxa named by William Chapman Hewitson